Shell Pakistan Limited is a Pakistani oil and gas company which is a subsidiary of the Shell plc and has been in South Asia for over 100 years. Shell's flagship business in Pakistan is the downstream retail marketing company, Shell Pakistan Limited, which has interests in downstream businesses including retail, lubricants and aviation.

Company overview 
Shell Pakistan has a primary listing on Karachi Stock Exchange. It is also listed on Lahore and Islamabad Stock Exchange.

Shell Pakistan Ltd. has 782 petrol pumps, whereas Cnergyico has 982 petrol pumps, the State-owned Pakistan State Oil Co. has 3,500 petrol pumps and Total Parco Pakistan Ltd. has 800 petrol pumps.

Shell’s History in the South Asia
 1898 Asiatic Petroleum (percentage ownership of Shell – 100%)
 1928 Burmah Shell (percentage ownership of Shell – 50%)
 1947 Burmah Shell (Pakistan) (percentage ownership of Shell – 50%)
 1970 Pakistan Burmah Shell (percentage ownership of Shell – 24.5%)
 1993 Shell Pakistan Ltd. (percentage ownership of Shell – 51%)
 2000 Shell Pakistan Ltd. (percentage ownership by Shell – 59.7%)
 2002 Shell Pakistan Ltd. (percentage ownership by Shell – 76.1%)

Shell Businesses/Stakeholders
Shell Pakistan – OP Marketing (Aviation and Commercial)
 Lubricants
 Retail
 Pakistan Refinery Limited. (PRL)
 Pak Arab Pipeline Co. (PAPCO)

Aviation
The Aviation business is an important and profitable part of Shell Pakistan Limited's (SPL) portfolio. Shell's presence at five major airfields across Pakistan has enabled the company to be involved in supplying both domestic and foreign airline carriers, making Shell Aviation the second largest Jet fuel supplier in Pakistan with over 30% market share.

Shell Lubricants

SPL is the largest lubricant marketing company in Pakistan with over 20% share of the total lubricant market in the country. SPL's lubricant business is the second most profitable within Shell's Global Lubricant portfolio. The business is focused on sales of key Shell brands (Rimula, Helix & Advance) to high street traders and the transportation sector as well as heavy-duty brands to industrial customers and power sector customers.

Shell Retail
SPL is the second-largest oil marketing company (OMC) and the largest private OMC in Pakistan with a 25% share of the white-oils market. The Retail business comprises over 800 retail outlets.

Pakistan Refinery Limited
Pakistan Refinery Limited (PRL), located at Karachi, is the third largest refinery in the country, with a refining capacity of 2.1 mn tons per annum. The refinery was set up in the 1960s, and Shell has a 26% equity interest in it. With the introduction of the deemed duty element in the oil products pricing mechanism in 2001, the refineries profitability has improved considerably. As 50% of its profits are mandated by the Government to be retained for upgrading/modernization, PRL is now embarking on major up-gradation projects including expansion and de-sulphurization.

Pak-Arab Pipeline Company Limited
In August 2001, a new company called Pak-Arab Pipeline Company (PAPCO) was formed to construct and operate a critical 840 km white-oil pipeline for transportation of AGO from Karachi to major markets in the centre and north of Pakistan. SPL has a 26% equity interest in PAPCO and the PAPCO's Chief Financial Officer remains a SPL nominee. The pipeline has been operational since Q1/2005 and is an important element in business continuity and transport safety in the sector.

Corporate affairs

Management
Farooq Rehmatullah succeeded David M Weston in 2001, to become the first Pakistani national CEO of SPL. He retired in 2006.
SPL Managing Directors
 Farooq Rehmatullah – April 2001-June 2006
 Quentin D’Silva – May–August 2006
 Zaiviji Ismail bin Abdullah – September 2006-July 2011
 Sarim Sheikh – April 2011-July 2012
 Omar Y Sheikh – June 2012 – July 2016
 Jawwad A Cheema – August 2016 
 Zahra Shozab Ali – December 2020 – present
Waqar I. Siddiqui is the CEO and managing director of Shell Pakistan Limited.  
Prior to this role, he has held several senior leadership roles within the Shell Group. He was the Consultancy Manager in the Downstream Strategy & Consultancy team, Customer Experience Manager managing Global Operational Excellence for Retail and Retail General Manager in Indonesia managing Retail's entry into this new market.

Board of Directors
 Jawwad Ahmed Cheema (Chairman)
 Waqar I. Siddiqui (Managing Director & CEO)
 Faisal Waheed
 Rafi H Basheer
 Farrokh K Captain
 Imran R Ibrahim
 Nasser N S Jaffer
 Zaffar A Khan
 Haroon Rashid
 Badaruddin F Vellani
 Moon Hussain
 Klaas Mantel

Shell Pakistan in 2012
Shell Pakistan Limited (SPL) has more than 850 retail stations in more than 330 cities, having 20% market share and is the largest foreign investor in Pakistan's oil marketing sector. Shell has been the leader in the lubricants sector since 2002, currently with more than 40% share of the organized sector.
Shell's Commercial Fuels business (including commercial transport) is a significant opportunity for growth. Its aviation business supplies fuels to six key airports across Pakistan. Shell has 30% interest in the Pakistan Refinery Limited (PRL) (average production: 40,000 bpd) located in Karachi and a 26% interest in US$480mn 780 km white oil pipelines.
In FY2010-2011 the Company earned a profit after tax of Rs. 906 million and recorded 11% growth in net revenue and 3% increase in gross profits compared to previous year.

Fast facts
 The company is the largest international marketer of oil products with 850+ retail stations and 17% market share in white oil products, supplied by 7 depots across the country
 Aviation is the second largest provider of jet fuels and is present at five airfields.
 From 2008 to 2010, Shell made a significant investment to implement Global SAP in Pakistan to upgrade its systems and processes for increased customer services those services has been provided by IBM and Naveed Ali Tahir was the project manager.
 Maaz Ahmed Raza was the Project Lead Engineer(GSAP) at Lube Oil Blending Plant (Shell Lubricants Division).

Government receivables
One of SPL's biggest challenges to doing business in Pakistan is Government receivables owed to it. These receivables are due on account of price differential claims, sales tax and Petroleum Development Levy. Currently, they stand at an all-time high of Rs 13,800 million (94.5 million GBP). Due to delays in the receipt of these receivables, Shell suffered approximately Rs 1,700 million in additional financing costs in 2011 to run day-to-day operations.
Note: Given below are headings in Wikipedia article on Royal Dutch Shell.

Notes

References

 
 Shell Pakistan Annual Report 2011

Automotive fuel retailers
Oil and gas companies of Pakistan
Shell plc subsidiaries
Pakistani subsidiaries of foreign companies
Companies listed on the Pakistan Stock Exchange